TV Slagalica or simply Slagalica is a Serbian quiz show produced by RTS and airs on RTS1. It is based on Des chiffres et des lettres, a French game show. It first aired on 22 November 1993. at 7 pm. It consists of seven simple mind games (word, number and knowledge games). Contestants play for a spot in the quarter finals, semi finals and then the finals. Contestants win prizes as they progress. It has four female hosts: Marija Veljković, Kristina Radenković, Milica Gacin and Jelena Simić. After the end of each 10th series, winners of each of the previous 10 series', with the addition of 6 runners-up, play in the superfinal using the same system as a regular series. In the superfinal, there is also an additional game played.

History
TV Slagalica is the longest-running quiz show which has survived competition from internationally created quiz shows with local production in Serbia (such as Who Wants to Be a Millionaire? and The Weakest Link).

The first show aired on 22 November 1993 under the name of Muzička Slagalica. The producers changed over time, there have been a total of 20 hosts, 20 different games, 5000 contestants, the air time has changed numerous times, the studio design has changed as well as the sponsors, prizes and the name (to TV Slagalica).

On  7 April 2006 the quiz aired its 3000th episode. Since May 2007 the show has started airing daily at 19:00 Central European Time. The 157th season of TV Slagalica began airing on 2 December 2022.

Programming

TV Slagalica is aired according to seasons. Each season has 61 episodes and in each show there are 2 contestants. The contestants are chosen by a test conducted before the quiz is filmed. Out of the total 61 episodes in each season, 40 are qualifier shows for the quarter finals and 21 episodes are for those that have won in the previous forty episodes competing for a spot in the top 8. Each contestant gets an award even if they are defeated by their opponent. Each episode starts with the host announcing the episode number and current season and introducing the contestants. The introduction used to include the supervisor Milka Canić that welcomed the viewers with the, now iconic, greeting: Good evening.

Ratings
Even though the quiz show is not as high tech as others, TV Slagalica has managed to bring in a high ratings for its network averaging approximately 1.5 million viewers on work days.

Games
Slagalica - Igra sa slovima (Puzzle - Letter game)
A computer flashes letters of the Serbian Cyrillic alphabet. The first contestant says "stop" 12 times and therefore twelve letters are displayed. The two contestants try and work out the longest Serbian word they can make from the 12 letters. Each letter is worth 1 point. If the word declared is the longest possible, an additional 5 points is awarded. The person with the word with more letters wins. The game is played twice (each contestant chooses the letters once).

Moj Broj - Igra sa brojevima (Math game)
The players randomly (by saying "stop", like in the first game) pick a 3-digit number and 6 more numbers (4 single-digit numbers, one which is one of 10, 15 or 20 and one is 25, 50, 75 or 100). The players must use the six numbers and basic mathematical operations to get a result as close to the given number as possible. A 90-second time limit is imposed. After the time limit, the players report their results and the one with the closer result presents the equation. If the equation is wrong, the other player presents his equation. The game is played twice, each time one of the contestants picks the numbers.

Korak po korak - Igra otkrivanja pojmova (Word detection game)
The players are trying to guess the hidden word through 7 steps. Time takes about 5 seconds on each step, then the player in turn must guess the word. If he cannot guess, the other player tries to do it. First step is always the hardest and last step is the easiest.

Skočko (Mastermind)
The players play mastermind game. Each player plays once and has 6 attempts to guess the 4-symbol combination. If the player fails to do so, the other player has one attempt to guess his opponents combination. Skočko refers to the mascot of the show, which is also one of the 6 images that can form the combination. Other are playing card suits (hearts, clubs, diamonds and spades) and a star.

Slovo po Slovo (Hangman)
This game is only played in the superfinal.

The players are offered blank letter spaces that when filled, contain a phrase, book name, movie name and similar. The game is played twice, each time started by a different player. Each player starts off with 30 points. The player guesses a letter. When guessed, the letter appears in all empty spaces it would show up in when the phrase is complete. Every time they guess a letter that appears in the clue, they lose a point, but if the letter does not appear at all, they lose three points. After the time runs out, the player guesses the phrase. If they manage to do so, they are awarded the number of points they had left. If they do not, the other player gets a chance to guess the phrase. If they manage to do so, they are awarded five points. No points are awarded if neither player guesses the given phrase.

Spojnice (Connections)
The players are offered two sets of 10 words or sentences. The game is played twice, each started by a different player. Each game has a theme and each word from the first set needs to paired up with the corresponding word in the other set. Each connection is worth two point. When they make a mistake, they move onto the next word, not getting points for the missed word. The process repeats until the last word. If any words remain unconnected, the second player tries to connect them, receiving one point per connection. No points are awarded for words that none of the players could connect.

Ko zna zna (General knowledge game)
Ten general knowledge questions are asked, the first one always being related to the Serbian language, and the last one always being related to sport. When the question is asked, players can apply to apply to answer. If players apply, the player that applied first gets the opportunity to answer first. Each question is worth 10 points. If the first applied contestant does not know the answer, and the second contestant applied as well, the second contestant gets a chance to answer and vice versa. If a contestant answers incorrectly, they lose five points. It is possible for a contestant's score to fall below zero. This game brings the most points to the players, with up to 100 points up for grabs.

Asocijacije (Associations game)
Contestant must solve 2 associations. They have four minutes to do so.

Retired games
Berza (Auction game)
The players have been offered a set of questions to which the answers are 50:50 or 3:1 chance to answer correctly (most usually yes/no questions), and then the players bid which one will have more correct answers. If the highest bidder answers the exact number of questions they bid for or more, they win, otherwise, the other player takes points.

Budite detektiv (Detective game)
The players have been told about mysterious person or object and they must guess who the person/object is.

Dodavanje (Number adding game)
The players choose five numbers from the randomly chosen set of numbers. Then the player randomly chooses a target number, which contestants must reach by adding up their chosen numbers. They take turns adding numbers. If a player reaches the target number they are the winner. If it's players' turn to add, and after the addition the sum becomes larger than the target number, their opponent wins.

Nije nego ("The other way around")
The players must guess the names of books, movies etc. by the title with antonym words (for example: "A Midwinter Day's Reality" for "A Midsummer Night's Dream"). Each player has five titles to guess and has five seconds for each. After that, the other player tries to guess the ones the first player missed.

Crew
Current crew of Slagalica:

 Hosts: Marija Veljković, Kristina Radenković and Milica Gacin.
 Director: Živojin Čelić
 Quiz coordinator: Anja Vasiljević

Gaming supervisor Milka Canić became somewhat of a staple television personality from Serbia, as she always started the show by simply greeting the contestants and the host with the catchphrase "Dobro veče" ("Good Evening"), the remark for which she became notable for being in use for more than 10 years of the show's run. Canić is not present in the studio during the competition since 2012, but is still credited as the supervisor.

Seasons and rankings
As of December 2022 Slagalica is on its 157th season (a Superfinal season). Winners and rankings in each season can be seen in the table below.

Superfinals
Besides regular seasons, as of March 2013, four superfinals have taken place featuring best contestants in regular seasons. The fourth superfinal was also counted as Season 60, which took place in 2009 and it included the total of 231 best competitors since the inception of TV Slagalica. Below is the table of superfinal rankings.

References

External links
 Slagalica at rts.rs
 Slagalica.tv - a website where you can play all games from slagalica online
 Igrica Slagalica (.exe file)

1993 Serbian television series debuts
Radio Television of Serbia original programming
Serbian game shows
Serbian-language television shows